Legrandellus is a genus of moths of the family Crambidae. It contains only one species, Legrandellus fuscolarosalis, which is found on the Seychelles (Aldabra).

References

Spilomelinae
Crambidae genera
Monotypic moth genera
Taxa named by Eugene G. Munroe